The 1914–15 season was the 38th Scottish football season in which Dumbarton competed at national level, entering the Scottish Football League. All national cup competitions were suspended for the duration of the First World War.  In addition Dumbarton played in the Dumbartonshire Cup.

Scottish First Division 

Dumbarton's second successive season in the First Division saw an improved performance by finishing 13th out of 20, with 34 points, 31 behind champions Celtic.

Dumbartonshire Cup
The Dumbartonshire Cup returned to being played on a league basis followed by a final between the top two, and for the first time since the 1898-99 season Dumbarton were successful by beating Vale of Leven in the final.

Final league table

Friendlies/Benefit Matches
During the season, a friendly, a benefit and a charity match were also played, drawing 2 and losing the other, scoring 6 goals and conceding 7.

Player statistics

Squad 

|}

Source:

Transfers

Players in

Players out 

Source:

In addition James Blyth, Jack Brown, James Chalk, Alexander Clarkson, John Davie, Alex Forsyth, Archibald Frew, Harry Gildea, Samuel Hendry, Thomas Lawrie, William Murray, John Plank, Andrew Potter, John Robertson and Walter Wilson all played their final 'first XI' games in Dumbarton colours.

Reserve Team
Dumbarton scratched from the competition at the second round stage of the Scottish Second XI Cup.

References

Dumbarton F.C. seasons
Scottish football clubs 1914–15 season